"The Trunk" is the forty-ninth episode and the fourteenth episode of the third season (1988–89) of the television series The Twilight Zone. In this episode, the proprietor of a hotel discovers a trunk which provides him with any object he wants.

Plot
The friendless Willy Gardner operates a run-down hotel called the Winchester. While cleaning out rooms for check-out time, he comes across an abandoned, empty trunk in room 303. He makes an off-hand wish that he had a nickel for every piece of luggage someone left behind. He attempts to move it but it has become too heavy. Willy opens it again to find it filled with nickels. Further experimental wishes are also granted whenever he opens the trunk.

Willy uses the trunk to get a tuxedo and all the desired furnishings for his apartment. Willy has a party and invites all of his longtime guests, freely granting them bottles of champagne. He talks with a woman named Candy who spells out for him that she will be his girlfriend if he buys her things. He tells her he wants someone who will love him for himself rather than his possessions. Willy then realizes he feels the same way about having friends and tells his guests to take whichever of his possessions they want and leave him alone.

Three hoodlums Willy invited return after the party, demanding to know where the money he has been flaunting is hidden. Willy gets away and runs upstairs to the room with the trunk. He makes a wish and hides inside the trunk. The hoodlums search inside the trunk but cannot see or hear him, and run off when they hear police sirens. Willy attempts to leave the trunk but finds he is locked in and still cannot be heard.

Later, a woman moves into an apartment and finds the trunk there. She receives a phone call from her mother and they talk about her recently being dumped. The woman vents "You don't think I want to find a decent guy to spend my life with? I wish!" She opens the trunk and, to her delight, inside is Willy Gardner, who is now clean-cut and well-dressed.

External links
 

1988 American television episodes
The Twilight Zone (1985 TV series season 3) episodes

fr:La Vieille Malle